Teofilo Testa, O.F.M. Obs. (1631–1695) was a Roman Catholic prelate who served as Bishop of Tropea (1692–1695).

Biography
Teofilo Testa was born in S. Pauli, Italy on 12 September 1631 and ordained a priest in the Order of Observant Friars Minor.
On 25 June 1692, he was appointed during the papacy of Pope Innocent XII as Bishop of Tropea.
On 18 December 1655, he was consecrated bishop by Ferdinando d'Adda, Cardinal-Priest of San Clemente, with Tommaso de Franchi, Bishop of Melfi e Rapolla, and Francesco Antonio Triveri, Bishop of Andria, serving as co-consecrators. 
He served as Bishop of Tropea until his death on 21 October 1695.

References

External links and additional sources
 (for Chronology of Bishops) 
 (for Chronology of Bishops) 

17th-century Italian Roman Catholic bishops
Bishops appointed by Pope Innocent XII
1631 births
1695 deaths
Observant Franciscan bishops